Joseph Abangite Gasi (January 1, 1928 – September 12, 2014) was a Roman Catholic bishop.

Ordained to the priesthood in 1957, Gasi was named bishop of the Roman Catholic Diocese of Tombura-Yambio, South Sudan and retired in 2008.

Notes

External links

1928 births
2014 deaths
20th-century Roman Catholic bishops in South Sudan
South Sudanese Roman Catholic bishops
Roman Catholic bishops of Tombura-Yambio